Dimitrios Kokkinakis (8 August 1929 – 22 October 2014) was a Greek footballer. He played in three matches for the Greece national football team in 1954. He was also part of Greece's team for their qualification matches for the 1954 FIFA World Cup.

References

External links
 

1929 births
2014 deaths
Greek footballers
Greece international footballers
Place of birth missing
Association footballers not categorized by position
Footballers from Volos